Gerry Martina  (5 February 1928 – 3 April 1990) was a Dublin member of the 1956 and 1960 Irish Olympic wrestling teams, finishing a notable 4th in the Men's Light-Heavyweight Freestyle category in 1956 in Melbourne, Australia. Martina also won the British Senior male Light-Heavyweight Freestyle championship in 1956. He trained Drogheda United in the 1950s and the League of Ireland XI team in the 1960s.

Martina was a rugby player before competing in wrestling. After competing in the Olympics, he was a masseur for Ireland's football team.

Sources
 DUFC A Claret and Blue History by Brian Whelan (2010)

References

External links
 
Official Olympic Reports
International Olympic Committee results database

Irish male sport wrestlers
Wrestlers at the 1956 Summer Olympics
Wrestlers at the 1960 Summer Olympics
Olympic wrestlers of Ireland
1990 deaths
Date of death unknown
Place of death missing
Sports masseurs